Rockley is a small village in the Central Tablelands region in New South Wales, Australia.

Rockley has a tablelands climate similar to Bathurst. Summers are generally warm and mild. Autumn is generally mild to cool with few frosts at the end of the season. Winter is generally cool to cold with some day times maxima under 5 degrees, there are on average about 3 snowfalls per years. Many days through winter have thick frost and fog. Spring has some late frosts and then days turn warm.

History
Rockley was first opened as a township in 1848 after a copper mine was opened 8 km from the town and gold was also uncovered. However it was first granted as farm land to William Lawson in 1818, then granted to Captain Watson Augustus Steel who named the property after his birthplace in Wiltshire England.

Buildings
Currently the village has two churches, an Anglican church and a Catholic church. There are two recreation halls, the School of Arts Hall and the Sports Oval Hall.

Accommodation is available at a bed and breakfast that was at one time a bank building on Budden Street in the centre of the town.

References

External links 
 

Towns in New South Wales

Mining towns in New South Wales